William Paul Girvan (born 6 July 1963) is a Democratic Unionist Party (DUP) politician, who has been the Member of Parliament (MP) for South Antrim since 2017.

He was elected to Newtownabbey Borough Council in 1997, and from 2002 to 2004 served as its mayor. He is currently the Chair of the council's Development Committee.

In 2003, he was elected to the Northern Ireland Assembly, representing South Antrim. He was deselected by the DUP in South Antrim in 2007, but  returned to the Assembly in 2010 when he was selected to replace William McCrea following his resignation. In the 2017 general election, he was elected as the Member of Parliament for South Antrim, having defeated the incumbent Ulster Unionist Party (UUP) Member, Danny Kinahan.

In March 2019, Girvan was one of 21 MPs who voted against LGBT inclusive sex and relationship education in English schools.

Sources

External links
NIA profile

1963 births
Living people
Northern Ireland MLAs 2003–2007
Northern Ireland MLAs 2007–2011
Northern Ireland MLAs 2011–2016
People from Ballyclare
Northern Ireland MLAs 2016–2017
Northern Ireland MLAs 2017–2022
UK MPs 2017–2019
UK MPs 2019–present
Democratic Unionist Party MPs
Members of the Parliament of the United Kingdom for County Antrim constituencies (since 1922)
Democratic Unionist Party MLAs
Mayors of Newtownabbey
Members of Newtownabbey Borough Council